Franklin Thomas Backus (6 May 1813 – 14 May 1870) was an American lawyer and politician.  He was a defense attorney in the Oberlin–Wellington Rescue case and the Case Western Reserve University School of Law was once named for him.

Life 
Backus was born in Lee, Mass., 6 May 1813.  He was the fourth son of Thomas and Rebecca Backus.  While he was very young the family moved to Lansing, New York  He prepared himself for college while assistant teacher in an academy in Delaware kept by an older brother, and entered Yale College as a Junior in 1834.  On leaving college in 1836, he established a classical school in Cleveland, Ohio, and at the same time began the study of law.  Several notable younger Clevelanders attended his school, including Leonard Case, Jr., William Case, George Hoadly, and Horace Kelley.    In 1839 he was admitted to the bar. In January 1842, he married Miss Lucy Mygatt, who survived him.  In 1846 he was member of the Ohio House of Representatives, and in 1848 of the Ohio State Senate. In 1861 he was a member of the Peace Convention which met in Washington, with the hope of averting the American Civil War. The later years of his life were devoted to the duties of his profession, in which he had become eminent. His services were especially sought for by railroad corporations, and it is to the excessive and exhausting labor thus brought upon him that his death, from a disease of the heart, is to be attributed. He died in Cleveland, 14 May 1870.

Notes

References

External links

1813 births
1870 deaths
People from Lee, Massachusetts
Yale College alumni
Ohio lawyers
Ohio state senators
Members of the Ohio House of Representatives
Lawyers from Cleveland
Ohio Whigs
19th-century American politicians
Ohio Republicans
Ohio Democrats
County district attorneys in Ohio
Burials at Lake View Cemetery, Cleveland
19th-century American lawyers